Olive pomace oil is olive oil that is extracted from olive pulp after the first press. Once the mechanical oil extraction of olive oil is complete, approximately 5–8% of the oil remains in the pulp, which then needs to be extracted with the help of solvents, an industrial technique used in the production of most other edible oils including canola, peanut, and sunflower. Although the oil extracted in this manner is still olive oil, at retail it may not simply be called "olive oil". This is because the International Olive Council defines olive oil as "the oil obtained solely from the fruit of the olive tree, to the exclusion of oils obtained using solvents or re-esterification processes".

Retail grades
The International Olive Council has classified olive pomace oil into the following categories:

Crude olive pomace oil
Olive-pomace oil whose characteristics are those laid down for this category. It is intended for refining for use for human consumption, or it is intended for technical use.

Refined olive pomace oil
Oil obtained by refining crude olive-pomace oil. It has a free acidity, expressed as oleic acid, of not more than 0.3 grams per 100 grams and its other characteristics correspond to those laid down for this category.

Olive pomace oil
Oil consisting of a blend of refined olive-pomace oil and virgin olive oils fit for consumption as they are. It has a 
Warnings about possible carcinogenic properties of olive-pomace oil have been issued by the British Food Standards Agency as well as others. Quoting: "Olive-Pomace oil is made from the residue left after producing virgin olive oil. It is the lowest grade of oil and it represents only a tiny amount of the UK vegetable oil market, around 0.25% of the one million tonnes consumed each year."

The Spanish government reported that high levels of contaminants called polycyclic aromatic hydrocarbons (PAHs), some of which can cause cancer, were found in some olive-pomace oil products. The contamination is believed to result from the process used to produce this oil. The Spanish government introduced a temporary ban on olive-pomace oil in response to these findings. It has now set legal limits for the maximum amount of PAHs in olive oil.

Nutrition facts
824 Kcal / 100 ml) Facts per 100 ml
Total fat : 100 ml
Saturated fat : 14 ml
Polyunsaturated fat : 7 ml
Monounsaturated fat : 79 ml
Cholesterol : 0
Total of carbohydrates : 0
Proteins : 0
Sugars : 0
Fibre : 0
Sodium : 0

References

Olives
Vegetable oils